The 2000 Boston Marathon was the 104th running of the annual marathon race in Boston, United States and was held on April 17. The elite men's race was won by Kenya's Elijah Lagat in a time of 2:09:47 hours and the women's race was won in 2:26:11 by Catherine Ndereba, also Kenyan.

A total of 15,680 people finished the race, 10,207 men and 5473 women.

Results

Men

Women

References

Results. Association of Road Racing Statisticians. Retrieved 2020-04-13.

External links
 Boston Athletic Association website

Boston Marathon
Boston
Boston Marathon
Marathon
Boston Marathon